Wong Ka Man (born 21 November 1985) is a Hong Kong para table tennis player. She won a gold medal at the 2012 Summer Paralympics.

Wong has congenital intellectual disability.

References

1985 births
Living people
Hong Kong female table tennis players
Table tennis players at the 2012 Summer Paralympics
Table tennis players at the 2016 Summer Paralympics
Paralympic medalists in table tennis
Paralympic gold medalists for Hong Kong
Medalists at the 2012 Summer Paralympics
Sportspeople with intellectual disability
Paralympic table tennis players of Hong Kong
FESPIC Games competitors
21st-century Hong Kong women